Šušljici is a village in the municipality of Bugojno, Bosnia and Herzegovina.

Demographics 
According to the 2013 census, its population was nil, down from 15 in 1991.

References

Populated places in Bugojno
Serb communities in the Federation of Bosnia and Herzegovina